This is a list of airports in Laos (the Lao People's Democratic Republic), sorted by location.



Airports 
Airport name written in bold indicates availability of commercial flights.

See also 
 Transport in Laos
 List of airports by ICAO code: V#VL - Laos

References

External links 

Lists of airports in Laos:
Great Circle Mapper
FallingRain.com
Aircraft Charter World
The Airport Guide
World Aero Data

 
Laos
Airports
Airports
Laos